Periyathirukonam is a village on the bank of maruthai aaru in the Ariyalur taluk of Ariyalur district, Tamil Nadu, India.
The famous gods are Iyanar, Adaikka Karuppu, Nondi Karuppu, Malayala Karuppu. A temple build in 765AD is located on the South West corner of the village. It is located 20 km away from its district headquarters Ariyalur.

Demographics 
As per the 2001 census, Periyathirukonam had a total population of 2487 with 1226 males and 1261 females.

References 

Villages in Ariyalur district